Young Economist of the Year is an academic award granted to individuals that won the competition of the same name hosted by the Royal Economic Society (RES) in association with the Financial Times (FT). High school students around the world taking A Level and equivalent economics courses are eligible to submit a 1500-word short research paper on one of the economics topics announced annually by the host to participate in the competition.

In the latest 2019 competition, 1300 submissions were received and 36 best entries were shortlisted by the judging panel (yielding a very selective 2.7% acceptance rate). Among those, one best overall essay was awarded £1,000 while five best essays on each topic received £200. Each of the remaining shortlisters won a High Commendation from the judging panel of the Royal Economic Society. Authors of all the shortlisted essays are colloquially regarded as "Winners of the Young Economist of the Year" and have their name published in the website of the Royal Economic Society. The 2020 competition was won by Marco Minasi-Smith.

See also 

 List of economics awards
 Royal Economic Society
 Financial Times

External links 

 The Economist's Essay Competition for Young People
 Institute of Economic Affairs's Student Essay Competition
 Homepage of the Young Economist of the Year Competition

References 

British awards
Economics awards
Academic awards
Economics education